Corynascus is a genus of fungi within the Chaetomiaceae family.

References

External links
Corynascus at Index Fungorum

Sordariales